Conus betulinus, common name the betuline cone, is a species of sea snail, a marine gastropod mollusk in the family Conidae, the cone snails and their allies.

These snails are predatory and venomous. They are capable of "stinging" humans.

Description
The size of the shell varies between 40 mm and 170 mm. The color of the shell is yellow orange-brown, or white, with revolving series of spots, and short lines of chocolate upon narrow white bands. The spire is radiated with chocolate. The base of the shell is strongly grooved.

Distribution
This marine species occurs off 
 Aldabra
 Chagos
 Madagascar
 Mascarene Basin
 Mauritius
 Mozambique
 Seychelles
 Tanzania
Also off Indo-China, Indo-Malaysia, New Caledonia, Solomon Islands and Queensland, Australia.

References

 Linnaeus, C. (1758). Systema Naturae per regna tria naturae, secundum classes, ordines, genera, species, cum characteribus, differentiis, synonymis, locis. Editio decima, reformata. Laurentius Salvius: Holmiae. ii, 824 pp 
  Röding, P.F. 1798. Museum Boltenianum sive Catalogus cimeliorum e tribus regnis naturae quae olim collegerat Joa. Hamburg : Trappii 199 pp
 Reeve, L.A. 1843. Monograph of the genus Conus. pls 1–39 in Reeve, L.A. (ed.). Conchologica Iconica. London : L. Reeve & Co. Vol. 1. 
 Smith, E.A. 1891. On a collection of marine shells from Aden, with some remarks upon the relationship of the Molluscan Fauna of the Red Sea and the Mediterranean. Proceedings of the Zoological Society of London 1891(3): 390–436
 Oostingh, C.H. 1925. Report on a collection of recent shells from Obi and Halmahera, Molluccas. Mededeelingen van de Landbouwhoogeschool te Wageningen 29(1): 1–362 
  Dautzenberg, P. 1937. Gastéropodes marins. 3-Famille Conidae'; Résultats Scientifiques du Voyage aux Indes Orientales Néerlandaises de LL. AA. RR. Le Prince et la Princesse Lé Belgique. Mémoires du Musée Royal d'Histoire Naturelle de Belgique 2(18): 284 pp, 3 pls
 Salvat, B. & Rives, C. 1975. Coquillages de Polynésie. Tahiti : Papeete les editions du pacifique, pp. 1–391.
 Cernohorsky, W.O. 1978. Tropical Pacific marine shells. Sydney : Pacific Publications 352 pp., 68 pls. 
  Petuch, E.J. 1979. Twelve new Indo-Pacific gastropods. Nemouria 23: 1–20
 Wilson, B.R. & Gillett, K. 1971. Australian Shells: illustrating and describing 600 species of marine gastropods found in Australian waters. Sydney : Reed Books 168 pp.
 Wilson, B. 1994. Australian Marine Shells. Prosobranch Gastropods. Kallaroo, WA : Odyssey Publishing Vol. 2 370 pp. 
 Röckel, D., Korn, W. & Kohn, A.J. 1995. Manual of the Living Conidae. Volume 1: Indo-Pacific Region. Wiesbaden : Hemmen 517 pp.
 Puillandre N., Duda T.F., Meyer C., Olivera B.M. & Bouchet P. (2015). One, four or 100 genera? A new classification of the cone snails. Journal of Molluscan Studies. 81: 1–23

External links
 The Conus Biodiversity website
 Cone Shells – Knights of the Sea
 

betulinus
Molluscs of the Indian Ocean
Molluscs of the Pacific Ocean
Gastropods of Africa
Gastropods of Asia
Marine molluscs of Asia
Least concern biota of Asia
Gastropods described in 1758
Taxa named by Carl Linnaeus